IRLA may refer to:

 International Religious Liberty Association
 Irla – A neighbourhood in Mumbai
 Irish Republican Liberation Army